The 2014 Men's European Volleyball League was the eleventh edition of the annual men's Men's European Volleyball League, which featured men's national volleyball teams from ten European countries.

Montenegro defeated Greece 5–1 match points in the final, which was played over two legs, to capture their first title.

Format
This year saw no final four tournament. Instead the ten teams were split into two pools and played a single round robin with playing two matchups at home and two away, making a total of eight games for each team. The two top placed teams advanced to the semifinals, from where on a knockout system was used to determine the winner.

Teams

League round
All times are local.

Pool A

|}

Leg 1

|}

Leg 2

|}

Leg 3

|}

Leg 4

|}

Leg 5

|}

Pool B

|}

Leg 1

|}

Leg 2

|}

Leg 3

|}

Leg 4

|}

Leg 5

|}

Final round
All times are local.

Semifinals

|}

Leg 1

|}

Leg 2

|}

Final

|}

Leg 1

|}

Leg 2

|}

Final standing

Awards
Most Valuable Player
  Miloš Ćulafić

References

External links
Official website

2014 Men
Men's European Volleyball League